Buciumi is a commune located in Sălaj County, Crișana, Romania. It is composed of six villages: Bodia (Szilágybogya), Bogdana (Kásapatak), Buciumi, Huta (Csákyújfalu), Răstolț (Nagyrajtolc) and Sângeorgiu de Meseș (Meszesszentgyörgy).

See also
Castra of Buciumi

References

Communes in Sălaj County
Localities in Crișana